Ducati Moto is a motorbike racing game developed by 4J Studios and published by Bethesda Softworks.

Development
The game was announced in April 2008.

Reception

IGN rated the game a 6 out of 10 stating that Ducati Moto is not a bad game, it's just not a very good game. It's a very easy motorcycle racer that suffers from a lackluster presentation.

References 

2008 video games
Bethesda Softworks games
Nintendo DS games
Nintendo DS-only games
Motorcycle video games
Video games developed in the United Kingdom
Multiplayer and single-player video games
Vir2L Studios games